The 55th parallel south is a circle of latitude that is 55 degrees south of the Earth's equatorial plane. It crosses the Atlantic Ocean, the Indian Ocean, the Pacific Ocean and South America.

At this latitude the sun is visible for 17 hours, 22 minutes during the December solstice and 7 hours, 10 minutes during the June solstice.

Around the world
Starting at the Prime Meridian and heading eastwards, the parallel 55° south passes through:

{| class="wikitable plainrowheaders"
! scope="col" width="125" | Co-ordinates
! scope="col" | Country, territory or ocean
! scope="col" | Notes
|-
| style="background:#b0e0e6;" | 
! scope="row" style="background:#b0e0e6;" | Atlantic Ocean
| style="background:#b0e0e6;" | Passing south of Bouvet Island, 
|-
| style="background:#b0e0e6;" | 
! scope="row" style="background:#b0e0e6;" | Indian Ocean
| style="background:#b0e0e6;" |
|-
| style="background:#b0e0e6;" | 
! scope="row" style="background:#b0e0e6;" | Pacific Ocean
| style="background:#b0e0e6;" | Passing just south of Macquarie Island,  Passing just north of Bishop and Clerk Islets, 
|-valign="top"
| 
! scope="row" | 
| Islands of Gilbert, Londonderry, London, Thompson, Gordon, Hoste, Navarino and Picton, Magallanes Region
|-
| style="background:#b0e0e6;" | 
! scope="row" style="background:#b0e0e6;" | Pacific Ocean
| style="background:#b0e0e6;" | Beagle Channel
|-
| 
! scope="row" | 
| Isla Grande de Tierra del Fuego, Tierra del Fuego Province
|-valign="top"
| style="background:#b0e0e6;" | 
! scope="row" style="background:#b0e0e6;" | Atlantic Ocean
| style="background:#b0e0e6;" | Passing just south of Isla de los Estados,  Passing just south of the island of South Georgia,  (claimed by )
|}

See also
54th parallel south
56th parallel south

References

s55